75th Division or 75th Infantry Division may refer to:

 75th Reserve Division (German Empire)

 75th Division (People's Republic of China)
 75th Infantry Division (Russian Empire)
 75th Cavalry Division (Soviet Union)
 75th Guards Tank Division, Soviet Union
 75th Guards Rifle Division, Soviet Union
 75th Rifle Division (Soviet Union), part of 4th Army
 75th Division (United Kingdom)
 75th Infantry Division (United States)

See also

 List of military divisions by number
 75th Brigade (disambiguation)
 75th Regiment (disambiguation)